is a Japanese actress and voice actress represented by Aoni Production. Some of her major roles are Sally's mom and Sumire in the original Sally the Witch series, Furu-Furu in Majokko Megu-chan, and Queen Sayuri Kinniku in Kinnikuman.

Filmography

Anime

Tokusatsu

References

External links
  
 

1938 births
Living people
Voice actresses from Tokyo
Japanese voice actresses
Aoni Production voice actors